The Hague Convention on the Recognition and Enforcement of Foreign Judgments in Civil and Commercial Matters is a multilateral treaty governing the enforcement of judgments entered by one nation's legal authorities in other signatory nations. It is one of a number of conventions in the area of private international law of the Hague Conference on Private International Law in 1971.

States parties
Albania, Cyprus, Kuwait, Portugal and the Netherlands (Territory in Europe, Aruba and Curaçao) are parties to the convention.

External links 

Convention of 1 February 1971 on the Recognition and Enforcement of Foreign Judgments in Civil and Commercial Matters, Hague Conference website

Hague Conference on Private International Law conventions
Treaties concluded in 1971
Treaties entered into force in 1979
Treaties of Albania
Treaties of Cyprus
Treaties of Kuwait
Treaties of Portugal
Treaties of the Netherlands
1971 in the Netherlands
Treaties extended to Aruba
Treaties extended to Curaçao
20th century in The Hague